Sharon Johnston is an American architect and architecture critic. She is a founding partner of the firm Johnston Marklee & Associates based in Los Angeles.

Johnston has taught at a number of universities including Harvard Graduate School of Design, Princeton University, the University of California, Los Angeles, and has held the Cullinan Chair at Rice University and the Frank Gehry International Chair at the University of Toronto. In 2015, Johnston was named a Fellow of the American Institute of Architects for her contributions to the field.

Education
 Harvard University, Graduate School of Design Master of Architecture 1995
 Stanford University Bachelor of History

References

External links

Year of birth missing (living people)
Living people
Harvard Graduate School of Design faculty
Princeton University faculty
UCLA School of the Arts and Architecture faculty
Rice University faculty
Academic staff of the University of Toronto
Stanford University alumni
Harvard Graduate School of Design alumni
American women architects